Salvatore Esposito (born 3 January 1948) is an Italian former footballer from Torre Annunziata in the Province of Naples. He played as a midfielder for several clubs during his footballing career, most notably Napoli and Fiorentina.

As well as playing for many years at club level, Esposito was also called up for one appearance by the Italy national football team. His only international call-up and appearance came on the 8 June 1975.

Honours
Fiorentina
 Serie A: 1968–69

Napoli
 Coppa Italia: 1975–76

References

1948 births
Living people
People from Torre Annunziata
Italian footballers
Italy international footballers
S.S.C. Napoli players
ACF Fiorentina players
Hellas Verona F.C. players
A.C.N. Siena 1904 players
Alma Juventus Fano 1906 players
Empoli F.C. players
Benevento Calcio managers
Association football midfielders
Italian football managers
Footballers from Campania
Sportspeople from the Province of Naples